Nikola Jovović (born 13 February 1992) is a Serbian professional volleyball player. He is part of the Serbian national team. The 2019 European Champion and the 2016 World League winner. At the professional club level, he plays for Dynamo LO.

Career

National team
On 19 July 2015, the Serbian national volleyball team, including Jovović, made it to the final of the 2015 World League, and eventually won silver medals, losing to France (0–3).

Honours

Clubs
 National championships
 2009/2010  Serbian Cup, with Vojvodina Novi Sad
 2011/2012  German Cup, with VfB Friedrichshafen
 2013/2014  German Cup, with VfB Friedrichshafen

Youth national team
 2009  CEV U19 European Championship
 2009  FIVB U19 World Championship
 2013  FIVB U23 World Championship

Individual awards
 2009: CEV U19 European Championship – Best Setter
 2013: CEV European Championship – Fair Play Award

References

External links

 
 Player profile at LegaVolley.it   
 Player profile at Volleybox.net

Living people
1992 births
Sportspeople from Novi Sad
Serbian men's volleyball players
European champions for Serbia
Serbian expatriate sportspeople in Germany
Expatriate volleyball players in Germany
Serbian expatriate sportspeople in Italy
Expatriate volleyball players in Italy
Serbian expatriate sportspeople in Turkey
Expatriate volleyball players in Turkey
Serbian expatriate sportspeople in Russia
Expatriate volleyball players in Russia
Serbian expatriate sportspeople in France
Expatriate volleyball players in France
Arkas Spor volleyball players
Ziraat Bankası volleyball players
Ural Ufa volleyball players
Setters (volleyball)
21st-century Serbian people